Sonia Belkind (1858-1943) was a Jewish Palestinian physician of Russian origin. She is known as the first female physician in Palestine.

See also
 Bat Sheva Yonis-Guttman

References

19th-century women physicians
19th-century Jews
1858 births
1943 deaths